Cachaço is a village on the island of Brava, Cape Verde. It is situated in the mountains, 4 km south of the island capital Nova Sintra. In 2010 its population was 228. Its elevation is 592 meters. Cachaço is the second southernmost settlement in Cape Verde, after nearby Tantum. Some 4 km south is the southernmost point in Cape Verde, Ponta Nhô Martinho.

References

Villages and settlements in Brava, Cape Verde